National Radio News is a radio news reporting service that delivers news bulletins as "ready to air" items in a timely manner. The main stories of the day from a national and international perspective are covered and, where possible, updated throughout each day with fresh actuality and clips constantly added. National Radio News was introduced in 1997.

National Radio News (NRN) has been providing a news service for community radio for more than a decade. National Radio News produced at Charles Sturt University, Bathurst.

NRN broadcasts across Australia, to every state and territory, to regional and metropolitan areas, which features independent news, see your local community station for the full bulletins.

Stations serviced

Australian Capital Territory
89.5 FM – 1VFM Valley FM
91.9 FM -1WAYFM
94.3 FM -2XXFM

New South Wales
99.9 FM – 2BAY Byron Bay
92.7 FM – Bay and Basin FM Sanctuary Point
93.3 FM – 2BBB Bellingen
107.3 FM – 2BBB Bellingen
89.1 FM – 2BLU Blue Mountains
104.7 FM – 2BOB Taree
91.1 FM – 2CBD Deepwater
105.9 FM – 2CBD Deepwater
104.1 FM – 2CHY Coffs Harbour
107.9 FM – 2COW Casino
94.3 FM – 2DCB Dubbo
107.5 FM – 2EAR Eurobodalla
90.5 FM – 2EZY Lithgow
102.9 FM – 2HOT Cobar
98.7 FM – 2KRR Kandos
94.1 FM – 2LIV Wollongong
89.7 FM – 2LRR Lightening Ridge
100.3 FM – 2MCR Campbelltown
92.3 FM, 94.7 FM – 2MCE Bathurst and Orange
91.9 FM – 2MTM Coonamble
100.3 FM – 2NCR Lismore
101.9 FM – 2PAR Ballina
96.7 FM – 2QBN Queanbeyan
93.3 FM – 2SNR Gosford
99.7 FM – 2SSR Sydney South
101.5 FM – 2TRR Dunedoo
96.3 FM – 2TVR Tumut
106.9 FM – 2UNE Armidale
106.9 FM – 2VOX Wollongong
98.9 FM – 2WAR Gilgandra
103.9 FM – 2WAY Wauchope
99.5 FM – 2WCR Coonabarabran
103.1 FM – 2WET (Tank FM) Kempsey
100.3 FM – 2YAS Yass
92.3 FM – 2YYY Young

Northern Territory
100.5 FM – 8KIN (CAAMA) Alice Springs

Queensland
95.9 FM – 4ALL (Valley FM) Toogoolawah (Brisbane)
100.3 FM – 4BAY Redlands (Brisbane)
96.3 FM - 4BPR Bundaberg
94.7 FM – 4BCR Bundaberg
104.9 FM - 4GGO Gin Gin
91.5 FM – 4BRR Gayndah
101.5 FM – 4BSR Beaudesert
89.3 FM – 4SDB (formerly 4CCC) Warwick
89.1 FM – 4CCR Cairns
107.5 FM – 4CRM Mackay
107.5 FM – 4FCR Hervey Bay
103.7 FM – 4MBS Brisbane
101.3 FM – 4NSA Noosa
101.5 FM – 4OUR Caboolture
96.9 FM – 4ROCK Moranbah
98.5 FM – 4YOU Rockhampton

South Australia
89.1 FM – 5BBB Tanunda
94.5 FM – 5CCR Ceduna
88.3 FM, 89.3 FM, 94.7 FM – 5EFM Victor Harbour
89.3 FM – 5GFN Kadina
89.7 FM – 5PBA North Adelaide
107.7 FM – 5THE Millicent

Tasmania
93.7 FM, 98.5 FM, 100.3 FM – 7BOD StarFM St Helens
95.7 FM – 7HRT Poatina
103.7 FM – 7LTN City Park Radio Launceston
97.7 FM – 7TAS Tasman FM Nubeena
98.1 FM, 105.3 FM – WAY FM Launceston
97.1 FM – 7MID Oatlands

Victoria
96.5 FM – Alpine Radio
103.1 FM – 3BBR Drouin
104.7 FM – 3GCR Gippsland
96.5 FM – 3HHH Horsham and Districts
96.5 FM – 3INR Inner FM Heidelberg
103.5 FM – 3MBS Melbourne
99.7 FM – 3MCR Mansfield
96.9 FM, 101.7 FM – 3MGB Mallacoota
90.7 FM, 105.5 FM – 3REG East Gippsland
97.7 FM – 3SER Cranbourne (Melbourne)
99.1 FM – 3SFM Swan Hill
88.9 FM, 98.5 FM, 98.9 FM, 106.9 FM – 3UGE Upper Goulburn
101.3 FM – 3WPR oak fm Wangaratta
89.5 FM – Phoenix FM Bendigo

Western Australia
100.9 FM – 6CRA Albany
102.5 FM – 6KCR Kalamunda
92.1 FM – 6RTR Perth
89.7 FM – 6TCR Wanneroo (Twin Cities)
101.3 FM – 6YCR York

References

External links
 Official website

Australian radio programs